Hon. Samuela Bainikalou Vunivalu (born c. 1957 in Nadi) is a Fijian former rugby union footballer and current politician. He played as flanker.

Career
Vunivalu debuted in the 1987 Rugby World Cup, against Argentina, at Hamilton, on 24 May. He debuted as substitute, replacing Peceli Gale. His last match for Fiji was against France, at Auckland, on 7 June. He played three matches in the World Cup, two as a substitute and one as starting member, which was against New Zealand at Christchurch.

Coaching career
In 2010, Vunivalu coached the NRU-affiliated Mosi Rugby

Political career
During the 2014 general election, Vunivalu was elected a Member of the Parliament of Fiji for FijiFirst. He was not selected by FijiFirst as a candidate for the 2018 election.

References

External links
 

Fiji international rugby union players
Fijian rugby union players
Rugby union flankers
Fijian politicians
FijiFirst politicians
Sportspeople from Nadi
1957 births
Living people
I-Taukei Fijian people
Fijian sportsperson-politicians